Vallegrande is a province in the Santa Cruz Department, Bolivia.

Subdivision
The province is divided into 5 municipios (municipalities):

See also
La Higuera

Provinces of Santa Cruz Department (Bolivia)